Graham Elementary and Middle School (formerly Graham Expeditionary Middle School and Graham Primary School) is a public K-8 charter school in Columbus, Ohio. It was originally the Indianola Junior High School, the first junior high school in the United States. The building was owned by the Columbus City Schools, though it became operated by the Graham Family of Schools, and was sold to the organization in 2017. 2009 was the middle school's centennial year. Shortly thereafter, the school board closed that building for the 2010 school year and merged the school with the former Indianola Alternative School (see below).

History
The Columbus Board of Education formally approved the creation of junior high schools in Columbus, Ohio on July 6, 1909, with Indianola Junior High School being the first. Its school building, located at 140 East 16th Avenue in Columbus, still stands. In 1929, the school moved to a new building on 19th Avenue.

Until spring 2007 the building housed the Indianola Alternative Elementary School, which utilizes innovative and nontraditional approaches in the classroom to educate students in kindergarten through the eighth grade. The school was popular with the staff of nearby Ohio State University, who regularly enrolled their children in its progressive program. Educational programs at Indianola were conducted in consultation with education professors and students at Ohio State University.

Largely because of increasing enrollment demands, in 2007 Indianola students moved to the old Everett Jr. High, which had been occupied by the Arts Impact Middle School. The Indianola building was left vacant. In 2009 the school moved to the former Crestview Middle School in Clintonville, which was renovated in preparation for Indianola Alternative to move there. The move to this much larger building allowed Indianola Alternative to significantly increase its enrollment and become a K-8. The building remained vacant until the Graham Expeditionary Middle School opened in 2010.

See also
 Schools in Columbus, Ohio

References

External links
 

Schools in Columbus, Ohio
Public middle schools in Ohio
Charter schools in the United States
Columbus Register properties